"Reste" (Stay) is a song performed by Congolese-French singer and rapper Gims with the participation of British singer Sting, released on 23 August 2019. The song is taken from Transcendance (reissue of the Ceinture noire album) released in April 2019. It is the thirteenth single from the Ceinture noire album and the third of its reissue.  The song was also included in Sting's Duets compilation album (2021).

Charts

Certifications

References 

2019 songs
2019 singles
French songs
Gims songs
Songs written by Gims